Melvin E. "Sam" Lyle (June 18, 1924 – May 25, 2007) was an American football player, coach, and the founder of the Bobby Dodd Coach of the Year Award.

Playing career
Lyle played end at Louisiana State University from 1947 to 1949. He was the captain of the LSU Tigers team that played in the 1950 Sugar Bowl. He was drafted by the New York Bulldogs in the tenth round of the 1950 NFL Draft.

Coaching career
Lyle began his coaching career in 1951 as the ends coach at Georgia Tech under Bobby Dodd. He was an assistant on the Yellow Jacket teams that won the 1952 Orange Bowl and the 1953 and 1954 Sugar Bowls. In 1954, he moved to Oklahoma, where he was an assistant under future College Football Hall of Famer Bud Wilkinson. In his second and third seasons at Oklahoma, the Sooners won the College football national championship.

In 1958, Lyle succeeded another former Oklahoma assistant, Pop Ivy, as head coach of the Edmonton Eskimos. He resigned after only one season and returned to college football as an assistant at Florida.

Bobby Dodd Award
In 1976, Lyle created the Bobby Dodd Coach of the Year Award. The award, named after former Georgia Tech coach Bobby Dodd, is an awarded annually to the college football head coach whose team excels on the field, in the classroom, and in the community. Lyle also served as the chairman of the executive committee of the American Sportsmanship Council, the group who sponsored the Bobby Dodd Award.

Death
Lyle died of kidney failure on May 25, 2007 in Atlanta.

References

1924 births
2007 deaths
American football ends
Edmonton Elks coaches
Florida Gators football coaches
Georgia Tech Yellow Jackets football coaches
LSU Tigers football players
Oklahoma Sooners football coaches
South Carolina Gamecocks football coaches
Players of American football from Atlanta
Deaths from kidney failure